Kandleria vitulina  is a bacterium from the genus Kandleria isolated from calf rumen.

Previously classified as Lactobacillus vitulinus, it has been reclassified based on phylogenetic information.

References

External links
Type strain of Kandleria vitulina at BacDive -  the Bacterial Diversity Metadatabase	

Erysipelotrichia
Bacteria described in 1973